Richard Carver may refer to:

 Richard E. Carver (born 1937), mayor of Peoria, Illinois
 Richard Carver (architect), English architect